Phil Osaer (born 10 February 1980 in Livonia, Michigan) is an American former professional ice hockey goaltender, who played in the North American minor leagues before moving to partake a career abroad in Norway and Britain.

Playing career
In the 1999 NHL Entry Draft, Osaer was selected by St. Louis Blues in the seventh round, as the 203rd overall pick.

In April 2007, Osaer turned down a substantial offer from a Norwegian ice hockey club to stay with Cardiff Devils. However, on April 9, 2008, he decided to quit Cardiff for GET-ligaen team Sparta Warriors. Osaer returned to the Devils for the 2012-13 season before concluding his career with Lørenskog IK in Norway.

Awards and honours

References

External links

1980 births
American expatriate ice hockey players in Wales
American men's ice hockey goaltenders
Cardiff Devils players
Florida Everblades players
Hartford Wolf Pack players
Ice hockey players from Michigan
Living people
Louisiana IceGators (ECHL) players
Lørenskog IK players
Peoria Rivermen (ECHL) players
Rochester Americans players
San Antonio Rampage players
Sparta Warriors players
Sportspeople from Livonia, Michigan
St. Louis Blues draft picks
Texas Wildcatters players
Trenton Titans players
Waterloo Black Hawks players
Worcester IceCats players
Tampa Bay Lightning scouts
American expatriate ice hockey players in Norway